Gilbert Elliot (17 March 1800  – 11 August 1891)  was  Dean of Bristol from 1850 until his death.

The son of diplomat Hugh Elliot, he was born in Dresden and educated at St John's College, Cambridge.  He was ordained in 1824 and held incumbencies in Newington Butts, Barming, Kirkby Thore and Marylebone. He was Chaplain to the Archbishop of Canterbury from 1848 to 1850. He died in  Bristol.

References

1800 births
1891 deaths
People from Dresden
People from the Electorate of Saxony
Archdeacons of Bristol
Alumni of St John's College, Cambridge
Holders of a Lambeth degree